Pacific is a small unincorporated community in El Dorado County, California. It lies along U.S. Highway 50. The ZIP code is 95726. The community is inside area code 530.

A post office operated in Pacific from 1880 to 1893 and from 1894 to 1958, when it was transferred to the nearby community of Pacific House.

References

Unincorporated communities in California
Unincorporated communities in El Dorado County, California